Mango Soufflé is a 2002 Indian film written and directed by Mahesh Dattani. The film stars Atul Kulnani and Rinkie Khanna. It was promoted as "first gay male film from India" and was adapted from Dattani's own successful English play On a Muggy Night in Mumbai.

Plot
This movie begins when a gay fashion designer Kamlesh (Ankur Vikal) recovering from his recently ended relationship calls some of his friends over for dinner to make a special announcement about his personal life. But then Kamlesh's sister (Rinke Khanna)  enters the party with her fiancé (Atul Kulkarni), a man with a secret.

The movie includes skinny-dipping, hot summer kisses and an unexpected secret. It's a complete drama comedy about a group of gay Indian men.

Production
The movie was produced by Lotus Piktures. Mahesh Dattani debuts as the director of the movie. Naseeruddin Shah's daughter Heeba also played a small role. Most of the movie is shot on a farmhouse outside Bangalore with large windows overlooking a mango grove.

Cast
 Rinke Khanna as  Kiran 
 Darius Taraporewal as  Father of Kiran and Kamlesh 
 Veena Sajnani as  Mother of Kiran and Kamlesh 
 Ankur Vikal as  Kamlesh 
 Atul Kulkarni as  Ed (Edwin Prakash) 
 Mahmood Farooqui as  Maqsood 
 Pooja as Maid 
 Faredoon Dodo Bhujwala as Sharad 
 Heeba Shah as Deepali 
 Shunori Ramanathan as Girl (as Shenori Ramnathan) 
 Mikhail Sen as Boy 
 Kalyanraman as Bride's Father 
 Shilpa M. as Bride 
 Suma Sudhindra as Bride's Mother 
 Manek Shah as Boy on the Road 
 Sanjit Bedi as Bunny Singh 
 Denzil Smith as Ranjith 
 U.K. Jayadev as Groom's Father 
 Rubi Chakravarthy as Groom's Mother 
 Paul as Groom

References

External links

2002 films
Indian LGBT-related films